Natalya Lukyanenko (born 14 January 1963 in Kyiv) — is a former Ukrainian handball player who competed in the 1980 Summer Olympics and became Olympic champion. She played in the position of goaltender.

Career
She did not play any single match in the 1980 Olympics.

As player of HC Spartak Kyiv, she won European Champions Cup in the 1980/81 season.

References
 Досьє Федерації гандболу України
 Лукьяненко Наталья Николаевна // Большая олимпийская энциклопедия: В 2 т. / Автор-составитель В. Л. Штейнбах. — М.: Олимпия Пресс, 2006.

1963 births
Living people
Sportspeople from Kyiv
Soviet female handball players
Ukrainian female handball players
Handball players at the 1980 Summer Olympics
Medalists at the 1980 Summer Olympics
Olympic handball players of the Soviet Union
Olympic gold medalists for the Soviet Union
Olympic medalists in handball